Hen is a former municipality in Møre og Romsdal county, Norway. The  municipality existed from 1902 until its dissolution in 1964. Hen encompassed the valleys extending to the south and east of the Isfjorden in the northeastern part of the present-day Rauma Municipality.  The administrative center of Hen was the village of Isfjorden. The area of Hen Municipality is still a parish within the municipality of Rauma.  The parish has one church, Hen Church, located in Isfjorden.

The mountains Kyrkjetaket and Gjuratinden are both located in Hen.

History
The municipality of Hen was established on 1 January 1902 when the large Grytten Municipality was divided into Hen (population: 1,128) and Grytten (population: 1,728). During the 1960s, there were many municipal mergers across Norway due to the work of the Schei Committee. On 1 January 1964, the municipality of Hen (population: 1,663) was merged with the neighboring municipalities of Eid (population: 381), Grytten (population: 3,683), Voll (population: 1,163), and the southern part of Veøy municipality (population: 1,400) to form the new Rauma Municipality.

Government
All municipalities in Norway, including Hen, are responsible for primary education (through 10th grade), outpatient health services, senior citizen services, unemployment and other social services, zoning, economic development, and municipal roads.  The municipality is governed by a municipal council of elected representatives, which in turn elects a mayor.

Municipal council
The municipal council  of Hen was made up of representatives that were elected to four year terms.  The party breakdown of the final municipal council was as follows:

See also
List of former municipalities of Norway

References

Rauma, Norway
Former municipalities of Norway
1902 establishments in Norway
1964 disestablishments in Norway